Podrujnica is a village in the Kula Norinska municipality.

Architecture

Chapel and Church of Saint Roch 
The 11x6 metre Church of Saint Roch had started construction during the time of pastor Zrinko Brković, and it was completed in 2008 when Nikola Bodrožić was pastor. It replaced the old chapel.

The 8x4 metre concrete chapel had been built during the time of pastor Špirko Vuković. It was blessed by bishop Ivo Gugić on 10 September 1972. The belfry had three bells and a cross. It had continued the tradition of the old chapel of Saint Roch on Rujnica in Desne, from where a large chunk of the populace moved to Podrujnica in the beginning of the 20th century.

Demographics

References

External links

Populated places in Dubrovnik-Neretva County